Irina Anatolievna Gorbacheva (born 10 April 1988) is a Russian theater and film actress.

Biography
Gorbacheva was born in Zhdanov, Ukrainian SSR, now Vileyka, Ukraine. In 2006-2010 she studied at the Boris Shchukin Theatre Institute, the course of Rodion Ovchinnikov. During her studies, Irina was involved in the performances of the Vakhtangov Theater. After graduation, she took part in the interns' troupe of Pyotr Fomenko Workshop.

Personal life
In March 2015, she married Russian actor dubbing Grigory Kalinin. They divorced in 2018.

Filmography

Films

TV series

References

External links

1988 births
21st-century Russian actresses
Living people
People from Mariupol
Russian activists against the 2022 Russian invasion of Ukraine
Russian film actresses
Russian stage actresses
Russian television actresses
Ukrainian emigrants to Russia